Final Cut for Real ApS is a film production company based in Copenhagen, Denmark specializing in documentaries for the international market. The two Oscar-nominated groundbreaking documentaries The Act of Killing (2012) and The Look of Silence (2014) helped establish the company as a recognized provider of independent creative documentaries on the international stage. The recent years, Final Cut for Real has also expanded to fiction films and virtual reality. In 2019 Final Cut for Real Norway was established.

History & Overview
Final Cut for Real was founded in 2010 by the producers Signe Byrge Sørensen and Anne Köhncke, editor Janus Billeskov Jansen and film director Joshua Oppenheimer.

The company today consists of two additional producers, Monica Hellström (since 2010) and Heidi Elise Christensen, VR Producer/Post-Producer & Production Manager Maria Kristensen and Post-Producer & Editor Francesc Sitges-Sarda.

The company is based at Indiakaj in the former Freeport area of Copenhagen. Final Cut for Real has produced more than 30 documentaries, minor co-produced more than 20  documentaries and even produced a few feature films, among them Sundance winner The Nile Hilton Incident.

The productions of the company has been selected to a number of international film festivals, the documentaries has been part of e.g Cannes Film Festival, Berlin Film Festival, Toronto International Film Festival (Tiff), Sundance Film Festival, Telluride Film Festival, Moscow International Film Festival, Karlovy Vary International Film Festival, International Documentary Film Festival Amsterdam (IDFA), CPH:DOX (Copenhagen International Documentary Film Festival), Sheffield International Documentary Festival (SIDF), Hot Docs Canadian International Documentary Festival and others.

Filmography
 A House Made of Splinters (2022)
 Flee (2021)
 President (2021)
 HUSH (2020)
 Songs of Repression (2020)
 Attacked - The Copenhagen Shootings (2020)
 Meanwhile on Earth (2020)
 Patrimonium (2019)
 Forget Me Not (2019)
 What Walaa Wants (2018)
 Death of a Child (2017)
 The Distant Barking of Dogs (2017)
 Dreaming Murakami (2017)
 A Drowning Man (2017)
 Land of the Free (2017)
 Les Sauteurs (2016)
 The Dvor Massacre (2015)
 Pebbles at Your Door (2015)
 Pervert Park (2014)
 The Look of Silence (2014)
 Far from Home (2014)
 Life is Sacred (2014)
 TPB AFK: The Pirate Bay Away from Keyboard (2013)
 Chikara –The Sumo Wrestler’s Son (2013)
 Säilöttyjä unelmia (2012)
 Gulabi Gang (2012)
 The Act of Killing (2012)
 The Human Scale (2012)
 Traveling with Mr. T. (2012)
 Hjemvendt (2011)
 Verdens bedste kok (2011)
 The Kid & The Clown (2011)

Awards
Flee
 Nordic Council Film Prize 2021 
 Sundance Film Festival 2021 - Grand Jury Prize
 Götenborg Film Festival 2021 - Dragon Award Best Nordic Documentary
 
President
 Sundance Film Festival 2021 -  World Documentary Special Jury Award for Verité Filmmaking

HUSH
 AniDox:VR Awards 2020 - Most Innovative Work

Songs of Repression
 Festival Internacional de Documentales de Santiago (FIDOCS) 2020 - Best Chilean Documentary
 Reykjavik International Film Festival 2020 - "A Different Tomorrow" award 
 CPH:DOX 2020 – DOX:AWARD (main competition award)
 CPH:DOX 2020 – Politiken:Danish:Dox (critic’s award)
 Festival Internacional de Cine Valdivia (FICValdivia) 2020 - Best Chilean Film
 Cork International Film Festival 2020 - Best Cinematic Documentary

PATRIMONIUM
 Moscow International Film Festival 2019 - Artistic Excellence Award

What Walaa Wants
 HotDocs 2018 - Special Jury Prize 
 Margaret Mead Film Festival 2018 - Margaret Mead Filmmaker Award
 Vancouver International Film Festival 2018 - Women in Film + TV Artistic Merit Award 
 Forest City Film Festival 2018 - Best Documentary Feature
 Ajyal Film Festival 2018 - Hilal Award for Best Film

The Distant Barking of Dogs
 Peabody Award 2020
 Danish Producers’ Association, TV-prisen 2020 - Best documentary of the year 
 Association of Danish Film Critics, Bodil Awards 2019 - Best Documentary
 Danish Film Academy Award, the Robert, 2019 - Best Documentary
 EBS International Documentary Festival 2018 - Grand Prix
 Göteborg Film Festival 2018 - Dragon Award for Best Nordic Dox

Dreaming Murakami
 Hot Docs 2018 - Audience Award for Best Mid Length Documentary

A Drowning Man
 Dokufest, Kosovo - Best Short (co-winner) 
 Valladolid International Film Festival - Silver Spike
 Cork Film Festival - Grand Prix
 Festival International du Film de Bruxelles - Best Short Film
 Dubai International Film Festival - Best Short Film

Land of the Free
 CPH:DOX 2017 - Nordic DOX Award

Les Sauteurs
 Faito Doc Festival 2017 - Prix CPS
 Migranti Film Festival 2017 - Gianmaria Testa Award
 Ethnocineca 2017 - Excellence in Visual Anthropology Award
 Black Movies 2017 - Prix des Jeunes 
 Filmweekend Würzberg - 2nd Documentary Price
 Cinema Eye Honors 2017 - Spotlight Award
 Porto/Post/Doc- Honorable Mention
 Docs Against Gravity 2016 - Amnesty International Award
 DMZ Docs, Korea - White Goose Award for best film, Int. Competition
 Salina DOC Fest 2016 - Best Editing Award by The Italian Association of Film and TV Editors, AMC 
 Salina DOC Fest 2016 - Premio Tasca d'Almerita
 Porto/Post/Doc - Biberstein Gusmão Award (for emerging directors) to Abou Bakar Sidibé
 Frankfurt Lichter IFF 2016 - Main Award: Int. Feature length Award
 dokKa Karlsruhe, 2016 - Main Prize
 DocumentaMadrid 2016 - The Jury's Second Prize, Feature length Competition
 Hamptons Int. Film Festival - Honorable Mention
 Camden Int. Film Festival- Special Jury Mention 
 DOK.fest München 2016- Special Mention
 Berlinale 2016 - Ecumenical Jury Award

Pebbles at Your Door
 Palm Springs International Shortfest - Runner Up Best Documentary

Pervert Park
 Sundance Film Festival 2015 - World Cinema Documentary Special Jury Award for Impact

Far from Home
 Mumbai International Film Festival 2016 - Best Debut Documentary

Life is Sacred
Vilnius IFF Kino Pavasaris 2015 - Audience Award

The Look of Silence
 Acey Artist Choice Award - Best Documentary of 2015
 Acey Artist Choice Award - Best Editing in a Documentary 2015
 Festival d'Angers - Audience Award for Best Film of 2015
 Festival d'Angers- Grand Jury Prize - Special Mention 2015
 Austin Film Critics Association (AFCA) - Best Documentary of 2015
 Beboti Film Awards - Best Foreign Language Film of 2015
 Beboti Film Awards - Best Documentary of 2015
 Berlin Film Festival - Peace Film Prize of 2015
 Bodil Award - Danish Film Critics Association Prize - Best Documentary of 2015
 Boston Society of Film Critics (BSFC) - Best Foreign Language Film of 2015
 Busan International Film Festival - Best World Documentary (Cinephile Prize) 2014
 Burma Human Rights Human Dignity Film Festival - Aung San Suu Kyi Award 2015
 Calgary Underground Film Festival - Jury Awards Best Documentary Feature 2015
 Camerimage Film Festival - Best Documentary of 2015
 CINE Golden Eagle Award - Best Feature Length Documentary of 2015
 Cinema Eye Honors - Outstanding Achievement in Nonfiction Feature Filmmaking 2016
 Cinema Eye Honors - Outstanding Achievement in Direction 2016
 Cinema Eye Honors - Outstanding Achievement in Production 2016
 Central Ohio Film Critics Association - Best Documentary of 2015
 Cologne International Film and Television Festival - Phoenix Prize 2015
 CPH:DOX 2014 - Grand Prize (DOX Award) 
 Danish Arts Council - Prize of the Danish Arts Council 2014
 Danish Academy Award (Robert Prize) - Best Documentary of 2015
 DCist - Best Film of 2015
 Denver Film Critics Society - Best Documentary of 2016
 Denver Film Festival - Best Documentary of 2014
 Docs Against Gravity – Warsaw - Amnesty International Award 2015
 Docs Barcelona - Audience Award 2015
 Docs Barcelona - Amnesty International Award 2015
 Docs Barcelona - Best Documentary - Honorable Mention 2015
 Documenta Madrid - Audience Award of 2015
 Durban International Film Festival - Amnesty International Honorary Award 2015
 Festival Cinematográfico del Uruguay - Human Right Best Feature 2015
 Festival de Cine de Derechos Humanos Buenos Aires - Best Film of 2015
 Festival de Cinéma Valenciennes - Grand Prix 2015
 Festival de Cinéma Valenciennes - Prix de la Critique 2015
 Festival de Cinéma Valenciennes - Prix Étudiants 2015
 Gotham Award - Best Documentary of 2015
 Gothenburg International Film Festival - Dragon Award Best Nordic Documentary of 2015
 IDA Documentary Awards - Best Feature Documentary Award 2015
 Independent Spirit Award - Best Documentary of 2015
 Indiewire Critics Poll- Best Documentary of 2015
 Indonesian Alliance of Independent Journalists - Tasrif Award of 2015
 KBPS - Best Film of 2015
 London Critic's Circle Award - Foreign Language Film of the Year 2016
 MakeDox International Filmfestival - Best Film of 2015
 Milwaukee Film Festival - Jury Award Best Documentary of 2015
 Movies That Matter Festival - Vara Audience Award 2015
 Nonfics - Best Documentary of 2015                                                 
 Nonfics Critics Poll - Best Documentary of 2015
 NordicDocs - Special Jury Prize 2015
 Nordisk Panorama - Audience Award for Best Film 2015
 Nuremberg Human Rights Film Festival - Award of Honor 2015
 Nuremberg Human Rights Film Festival - Audience Award 2015
 Online Film Critics Society - Best Documentary of 2015
 Prague One World Film Festival - Best Film of 2015
 Realscreen - Best Documentay of 2015
 Ridenhour Documentary Film Prize 2015
 River Run International Film Festival - Best Director (Documentary) 2015
 Satellite Awards - Best Documentary of 2015
 Seattle Film Awards - Best Documentary of 2015
 Sheffield International Documentary Festival - Audience Award 2015
 Sofia International Film Festival - Best Documentary of 2015
 Subversive Film Festival - Wild Dreamer Award 2015
 SXSW Film Festival - Audience Award, Festival Favourites for Best Film 2015
 Toronto Film Critics Society - Best Documentary of 2015
 Tromsø International Film Festival - FICC Award/Don Quixote Prize 2015
 True/False Film Festival - True Life Fund Recipient Award
 Victoria Film Festival - Best Documentary of 2015
 Village Voice Critics Poll - Best Documentary of 2015
 Vilnius International Film Festival - Best Director 2015
 Venice Film Festival - Grand Jury Prize 2014
 Venice Film Festival - Human Rights Award 2014
 Best Film of Venice Film Festival - Critics Price (FIPRESCI) 2014
 Best European and Mediterranean Film of Venice Film Festival 2014 - European Critics Prize (FEDORA) 2014
 Best Film of Venice Film Festival - Online Critics Prize (Mouse d'Oro) 2014
 Zurich Film Festival - Special Mention - International Documentary 2014

Chikara –The Sumo Wrestler’s Son
 Al Jazeera Int. Film Festival 2015 - Winner of Jury Award for Medium Length Films

The Act of Killing
 CPH:DOX 2012 – DOX:AWARD (main competition award)
 Berlin Film Festival 2013 – Panorama Audience Award
 Berlin Film Festival 2013 – Prize of the Ecumenical Jury
 !F Istanbul 2013 – Prize of the SIYAD jury (Turkish Film Critics' Association)
 Danish Film Academy 2013 – Best Feature Documentary
 FICUNAM, Mexico 2013 – Audience Award
 ZagrebDox, 2013 – Movies that Matter Award
 One World, Prague 2013 – Best Film
 Geneva International Human Rights Film Festival 2013 – Gilda Vieira de Mello Prize
 Danish Film Critics Association – Special Prize 2013 (Sær-Bodil)
 Festival de Cinéma Valenciennes 2013 – Grand Prize
 Festival de Cinéma Valenciennes 2013 – Special Mention, Critic's Jury
 IndieLisboa 2013 – Amnesty International Award
 BelDocs 2013 – Grand Prix for Best Film
 DocumentaMadrid 2013 – First Prize of the Jury
 DocumentaMadrid 2013 – Audience Award
 Planete + Doc Warsaw 2013 – Audience Award
 Planete + Doc 2013 – Grand Prix of Lower Silesia
 DocsBarcelona 2013 – Best Film Award (Grand Prize)
 Sheffield Doc/Fest 2013 – Grand Prize
 Biografilm Festival Italy 2013 – Grand Prize
 Grimstad Short and Documentary Film Festival 2013 – Grand Prize
 Royal Anthropological Institute Film Festival 2013 – Basil Wright Prize
 Human Rights, Human Dignity Int. Film Festival Myanmar – Aung San Suu Kyi Award for Best Documentary
 Sheffield Doc/Fest 2013 – Audience Award

The Human Scale
 Aljazeera Int. Documentary Film Festival 2013 – Winner of the Child and Family Award for Long Film
 Planete Doc, Warsaw 2013 – Green Cross Award

The Kid and the Clown
 Aljazeera Int. Documentary Film Festival 2012 – Winner of the Child and Family Award for Medium Categories
 HotDocs 2012 – In competition: Medium Length Documentary
 TRT Documentary Awards 2012 – Winner of the first Special Prize in the International Category
 Kraków Int. Documentary Film Festival 2012 – Winner of the Silver Horn Award for Best Middle-length Documentary
 Pärnu Film Festival 2012 – Winner of Best Film for Kids

References

External links
 
 

Film production companies of Denmark
Mass media companies based in Copenhagen
Danish companies established in 2009
Companies based in Copenhagen Municipality